Gerdî (Kurdish:گەردی) is a Kurdish tribe inhabiting all of Derecik district in Turkey and adjacent parts of Kurdistan Region.

References

Kurdish tribes